Studiolab is a music software product developed by Swedish company Demagic AB.

Features
Score
The program has a number of editors for editing various aspects of a score, including notes and lyrics. The visual representation can be either musical notation or pianoroll view.

Patterns
A user may define a number of musical patterns that can be used by an automatic arranger to fill a composition with music wherever the score has no implicit notes. 
This allows the user to quickly test structures and chord progressions, while working on lyrics and melody.

Sharing
A user may create sounds and composition templates and share them with other users, using a Dropbox account.

Export
Compositions may be shared or exported as audio or MIDI files or PDF scores.

External links
 

Music production software
IOS software